Old Greek is the Greek language as spoken from Late Antiquity (c. AD 400) to around AD 1500. Greek spoken during this period is usually split into:

Late Greek (c. 400 – c. 800 AD)
Medieval Greek (c. 800 – c. 1500 AD)

"Old Greek" (OG) is also the technical term for the presumed initial Greek translations of the Hebrew Bible for books other than the Pentateuch.

Old Greek might also be understood to include a preceding period, Koine Greek, as well – also referred to as "the common dialect" or "Alexandrian dialect", "common Attic" or "Hellenistic Greek" – the universal dialect spoken throughout post-Classical antiquity (c. 300 BC – 300 AD).

See also
Mycenaean Greek language, also referred to as "Old Greek"
Ancient Greek
Proto-Greek

References 

Greek language